Feng Panfeng (born 20 December 1989) is a Chinese para table tennis player. He has won 7 gold medals and 1 bronze medal from three Paralympic Games (2008, 2012, 2016 and 2020).

Like many of his teammates, Feng was a polio survivor from Pizhou who attended New Hope Center as a child. That's where coach Heng Xin developed him into a star.

Personal life
Feng Panfeng is married to his national teammate Gu Gai. They have a son together.

References

1989 births
Living people
Table tennis players at the 2016 Summer Paralympics
Table tennis players at the 2012 Summer Paralympics
Table tennis players at the 2008 Summer Paralympics
Paralympic medalists in table tennis
Medalists at the 2016 Summer Paralympics
Medalists at the 2012 Summer Paralympics
Medalists at the 2008 Summer Paralympics
Chinese male table tennis players
Paralympic gold medalists for China
Paralympic bronze medalists for China
Paralympic table tennis players of China
People with polio
Para table tennis players from Pizhou
Table tennis players at the 2020 Summer Paralympics